Rachel Chan (born 15 November 2003) is a Canadian badminton player. She won the women's singles title at the 2020 Canadian National Championships and became Canada's youngest national champion. She has represented Canada in the Pan Am Junior Championships multiple times between 2016 until 2019, and the 2019 World Junior Championship making it to round of 32.  Rachel won silver at the 2021 Pan Am Championships in women's singles, debuting in her first senior level international tournament

Achievements

Pan Am Championships 
Women's singles

Pan Am Junior Championships 
Girls' singles

Girls' doubles

Mixed doubles

References

External links 
 

2003 births
Living people
Sportspeople from Toronto
Canadian sportspeople of Chinese descent
Canadian female badminton players
21st-century Canadian women